Hunga is a genus of plants in the family Chrysobalanaceae, described as a genus in 1979.

They are native to New Guinea and New Caledonia.

List of species
 Hunga cordata Prance - New Caledonia
 Hunga gerontogea (Schltr.) Prance - New Caledonia
 Hunga guillauminii Prance - New Caledonia
 Hunga lifouana (Däniker) Prance - New Caledonia, Loyalty Islands
 Hunga longifolia Prance - Papua New Guinea
 Hunga mackeeana Prance - New Caledonia
 Hunga minutiflora (Baker f.) Prance - New Caledonia
 Hunga myrsinoides (Schltr.) Prance - New Caledonia
 Hunga novoguineensis Prance - Papua New Guinea
 Hunga papuana (Baker f.) Prance - Papua New Guinea
 Hunga rhamnoides (Guillaumin) Prance - New Caledonia

References

 
Chrysobalanaceae genera
Taxonomy articles created by Polbot